Adams Township is the name of some places in the U.S. state of Michigan:

 Adams Township, Arenac County, Michigan
 Adams Township, Hillsdale County, Michigan
 Adams Township, Houghton County, Michigan

See also 
 Adams Township (disambiguation)

Michigan township disambiguation pages